Abkhazia–Russia relations is the bilateral relationship between the Republic of Abkhazia and the Russian Federation. Russia recognised Abkhazia on 26 August 2008, following the August 2008 Russo-Georgian War. Abkhazia and Russia established diplomatic relations on 9 September 2008.

Background

Russian recognition of Abkhazia

On 21 August 2008, the same day as a similar event in South Ossetia, a rally was held in Sukhum at which an estimated 47,00050,000 people appealed to Russian President Dmitry Medvedev and the Russian Federal Assembly for official recognition of their independence as a sovereign state. On 25 August 2008 President of Abkhazia Sergei Bagapsh made a presentation to the Federation Council of Russia. In his address to the Council, Bagapsh stated "I can say for certain that Abkhazia and South Ossetia will never be part of Georgia." After hearing the appeals from both the Abkhazian and South Ossetian leadership, on 25 August 2008 the Federation Council and State Duma passed motions calling upon President Medvedev to recognise the independence of the two regions and to establish diplomatic relations with them.

On 26 August 2008, President Medvedev signed decrees recognising the independence of Abkhazia and South Ossetia In his address to the Russian nation, Medvedev noted that he was guided by the provisions of the UN Charter, the 1970 Declaration on the Principles of International Law Governing Friendly Relations Between States, the CSCE Helsinki Final Act of 1975 and other fundamental international instruments in issuing the decree, and further stated, "(t)his is not an easy choice to make, but it represents the only possibility to save human lives." Sergei Bagapsh responded to the Russian recognition by saying "(t)his is the century-long dream of the people of Abkhazia made reality."

The Russian recognition was condemned by the European Union, United States, NATO, Parliamentary Assembly of the Council of Europe, amongst others, with some calling for Russia to rescind its recognition. Many high level Russian politicians including Russian President Dmitry Medvedev, Prime Minister Vladimir Putin, Deputy Prime Minister Sergey Ivanov, Chairman of the State Duma Boris Gryzlov, Minister of Foreign Affairs Sergey Lavrov, Permanent Representative of Russia to the United Nations Vitaly Churkin and Permanent Representative of Russia to NATO Dmitry Rogozin, rejected the criticism, and have stated that Russian recognition of Abkhazia is irreversible. In an interview to Vesti in August 2009, Sergey Lavrov stated that Russian recognition of Abkhazia and South Ossetia was not planned when the 2008 war began.

As a result of the Russian recognition of Abkhazian and South Ossetian independence, Georgia severed diplomatic relations with Russia on 29 August 2008, and declared that it regards South Ossetia and Abkhazia as occupied territories.

Bilateral relationship

Diplomatic ties

Russia and Abkhazia established diplomatic relations at embassy level on 9 September 2008, when Russian Foreign Minister Sergey Lavrov and Abkhaz Minister of Foreign Affairs Sergei Shamba exchanged notes at the Russian Foreign Ministry in Moscow.

On 25 September 2008, President Medvedev sign an ukaz appointing the first Russian Ambassador to Abkhazia, Semyon Grigoriyev, who presented his Letters of Credence to Abkhaz President Sergei Bagapsh on 16 December 2008. Igor Akhba, the Plenipotentiary Representative of the President of the Republic of Abkhazia to Russia was appointed by Sergei Bagapsh as Abkhazia's first ambassador to Russia on 14 November 2008. Akhba presented his credentials to Russian President Dmitry Medvedev on 16 January 2009.

Russian Prime Minister Vladimir Putin issued a directive to set up a Russian embassy in Abkhazia in 2009. On 1 May 2009, Russia's embassy to Abkhazia was opened in Sukhumi.

Russia plans on opening up a trade mission in Abkhazia in order to ease access to the local economy for Russian businesses.

In March 2009, Abkhazian President Sergei Bagapsh told the Vice President of the International Crisis Group that his republic had no plans to become a part of Russia and that his administration was "building an independent, legal, and democratic state."

List of treaties and agreements

See also
Foreign relations of Abkhazia
Foreign relations of Russia

References

External links

  Documents on the Abkhazia–Russia relationship from the Russian Ministry of Foreign Affairs

 
Russia
Bilateral relations of Russia
Articles containing video clips